Sarah and Samuel Nicholson House is located in Salem, Salem County, New Jersey, United States. The house was built in 1752 and was added to the National Register of Historic Places on February 24, 1975.

See also
National Register of Historic Places listings in Salem County, New Jersey

References

Houses on the National Register of Historic Places in New Jersey
Houses completed in 1752
Houses in Salem County, New Jersey
National Register of Historic Places in Salem County, New Jersey
Salem, New Jersey
New Jersey Register of Historic Places